Can't Breathe Without You may refer to:
 "Can't Breathe Without You" (Marc Terenzi song), a 2005 song
 "Can't Breathe Without You" (SpeXial song), a  song